Mosquito Creek is a stream in the U.S. state of Ohio.

Mosquito Creek was descriptively named for the mosquitos which were once frequent there. Native Americans called this creek the Tawawa.

See also
List of rivers of Ohio

References

Rivers of Champaign County, Ohio
Rivers of Shelby County, Ohio
Rivers of Ohio